Peel towers (also spelt pele) are small fortified keeps or tower houses, built along the English and Scottish borders in the Scottish Marches and North of England, mainly between the mid-14th century and about 1600. They were free-standing with defence being a prime consideration of their design with "confirmation of status and prestige" also playing a role. They also functioned as watch towers where signal fires could be lit by the garrison to warn of approaching danger.

The FISH Vocabulary Monument Types Thesaurus lists "pele" alongside "bastle", "fortified manor house" and "tower house" under the broader term "fortified house". Pevsner defines a peel as simply a stone tower. Outside of this, "peel" or "pele" can also be used in related contexts, for example a "pele" or "barmkin" (in Ireland a bawn) was an enclosure where livestock were herded in times of danger.  The rustling of livestock was an inevitable part of Border raids, and often their main purpose. In this usage, the tower usually stood at a corner of the pele.  Most pele enclosure walls have not survived, and some towers perhaps never had them.  Some, known as a "vicar's pele", housed the local vicar but could also serve as a refuge for the whole community.

History 
Peels were built in Scotland, Northumberland, Cumberland, Westmorland and North Riding of Yorkshire, and as far south as Lancashire, in response to the threat of attack from the English, Scots and the Border Reivers of both nationalities.

In Scotland, a line of these towers was built in the 1430s across the Tweed valley from Berwick to its source, as a response to the dangers of invasion from the Marches. In the upper Tweed valley, going downstream from its source, they were as follows: Fruid, Hawkshaw, Oliver, Polmood, Kingledoors, Mossfennan, Wrae Tower, Quarter, Stanhope, Drumelzier, Tinnies, Dreva, Stobo, Dawyck, Easter Happrew, Lyne, Barnes, Caverhill, Neidpath, Peebles, Horsburgh, Nether Horsburgh Castle, Cardrona, Kirna(Kirnie), Elibank.

By an Act of the Parliament of England in 1455, each of these towers was required to have an iron basket on its summit and a smoke or fire signal, for day or night use, ready at hand. Apart from their primary purpose as a warning system, these towers were also the homes of the lairds and landlords of the area, who dwelt in them with their families and retainers, while their followers lived in simple huts outside the walls. The towers also provided a refuge so that, when cross-border raiding parties arrived, the whole population of a village could take to the tower and wait for the marauders to depart.

Surviving towers 

Pele towers can be associated with a church: for example Embleton Tower in Embleton, Northumberland, is an example of a so-called 'vicar's pele' and the one at Hulne Priory near Alnwick is in the grounds of the priory. St Michael's Church, Burgh by Sands has a heavily fortified tower at the west end and a former vicar's pele at the east end. St Cuthbert's, Great Salkeld, is another example of a fortified church. Both these Cumbrian churches have yetts or strong internal iron gates to defend their towers against Scottish raiders.

Some peles were converted to castles, such as Penrith Castle. Some towers are now derelict while others have been converted for use in peacetime. Embleton pele tower was part of the former vicarage, now a private home, and that on the Inner Farne is a home to bird wardens. The most obvious conversion needs include access, which would have originally been made intentionally difficult, and the provision of more and larger windows. A pele tower in Hellifield, North Yorkshire featured in an episode of Grand Designs showing the conversion from a derelict state to a home and a bed-and-breakfast business.

Darnick Tower stands just outside Melrose and is still habitable. It was built in 1425 by the Heiton family from Normandy, and is considered one of the finest examples of a Borders pele tower.  It had remained the property of the same family until 2016.

Canons Ashby House incorporates one of only a few pele towers constructed in the Midlands; it owes its existence to the settlement of Cumbrian sheep farmer, John Dryden, in the county of Northamptonshire.

Corbridge Vicar's Pele in Northumberland has been converted to a small pub.

See also 
 Tower houses in Britain and Ireland
 Architecture in early modern Scotland#Vernacular architecture (section)
 Bastle house
 :Category:Fortified church buildings in England
 Manor house
 Scottish Vernacular
 Vernacular architecture

Notes

References 
Aslet, Clive and Powers, Alan, The National Trust book of the English House Penguin/Viking, 1985, 
"Historic England":

External links 
 

 Peel
Fortified houses
History of Cumbria
History of Northumberland
Buildings and structures in the Scottish Borders
 
 
Border Reivers
Vernacular architecture